James Mitchell Archibald (18 September 1892 – 25 January 1975) was a Scottish professional footballer.

Archibald, a Falkirk-born wing-half, began his career with Motherwell. He later moved to Tottenham Hotspur, making his Spurs debut in the 1919–20 season. He played 24 league games, scoring once, before moving to Aberdare Athletic in 1922. Thirty league games and 2 goals the following season resulted in a move to Clapton Orient in 1923. He played 52 times for Orient, 49 games in the League scoring once and three games in the FA Cup, before joining Southend United in 1926.
However, he left Southend to join non-league Margate without playing in the Southend first team. He later played for Tunbridge Wells Rangers. Archibald died on 25 January 1975 in Waltham Forest, London.

References 

1892 births
1975 deaths
Footballers from Falkirk
Scottish footballers
Motherwell F.C. players
Tottenham Hotspur F.C. players
Aberdare Athletic F.C. players
Leyton Orient F.C. players
Southend United F.C. players
English Football League players
Margate F.C. players
Tunbridge Wells F.C. players
Association football midfielders
Scottish Football League players